The 2022 Charlotte 49ers baseball team represented the University of North Carolina at Charlotte in the sport of baseball for the 2022 college baseball season. The 49ers competed in Division I of the National Collegiate Athletic Association (NCAA) and in Conference USA. They played their home games at Robert and Mariam Hayes Stadium in Charlotte, North Carolina. The team was coached by Robert Woodard, who was in his third season with the 49ers.

Preseason

C-USA media poll
The Conference USA preseason poll was released on February 16, 2022 with the 49ers predicted to finish in fourth place in the conference.

Personnel

Schedule and results

Schedule Source:
*Rankings are based on the team's current ranking in the D1Baseball poll.

Postseason

References

External links
•	Charlotte Baseball

Charlotte 49ers
Charlotte 49ers baseball seasons
Charlotte 49ers baseball